Oh! Susanna may refer to:
"Oh! Susanna", a song written by Stephen Foster in 1847
Suzie Ungerleider, a Canadian singer who performs as Oh Susanna
The Gale Storm Show, a television series known in syndication as Oh, Susanna
Oh Susanna, a Canadian improvisation variety show
Oh! Susanna (1951 film), a 1951 Western film starring Rod Cameron
Oh, Susanna! (1936 film), a Western film directed by Joseph Kane
Oh, Susannah!, a 1982 novel by Kate Wilhelm
Oh! Susannah!, an 1897 comedy play by Mark Ambient